There are over 1000 km of motorways in Denmark. They are all numbered and have formal names. The first motorway in Denmark opened in 1956 with the name Hørsholmvejen. Today this motorway is called Helsingørmotorvejen and is numbered E47.

All the Danish motorways are managed by Vejdirektoratet.

List of motorways

Motorways in Denmark

Jutland

 Frederikshavnmotorvejen (Nørresundby - Frederikshavn)
 Hirtshalsmotorvejen (Nørresundby - Hirtshals)
 Thistedgrenen (Nørresundby – Høvejen)
 Nørresundbygrenen Nordjyske Motorvej (exit 22 Hjørringvej) 
 Kridtsvinget Nordjyske Motorvej (exit 23 – Østre Allé)
 Ådalsmotorvejen Nordjyske Motorvej (exit 27 – Sønderbro)
 Mariendalsmøllemotorvejen Nordjyske Motorvej (exit 28 – Hobrovej)
 Nordjyske Motorvej (Aarhus - Aalborg)
 Østjyske Motorvej (New Little Belt Bridge - Aarhus)
 501 Aarhus Syd Motorvejen (Aarhus Syd – Viby J)
 502 Messemotorvejen (Herning Ø - )
 Herningmotorvejen (Aarhus - Herning)
 Silkeborgmotorvejen (Låsby- Funder)
 Djurslandmotorvejen (Aarhus - Løgten)
 Holstebromotorvejen ( - Holstebro N)
 Midtjyske Motorvej (Vejle N - Herning N)
 Esbjergmotorvejen (Kolding - Esbjerg) 
 Taulovmotorvejen (Kolding - Fredericia)
 Sønderjyske Motorvej (Skærup - Padborg)
 Sønderborgmotorvejen (Kliplev - Sønderborg)

Funen

 Fynske Motorvej ( New Little Belt Bridge - Great Belt Fixed Link )
 Svendborgmotorvejen (Odense - Svendborg)

Zealand / Lolland-Falster 

 Helsingørmotorvejen (Copenhagen - Helsingør)   
 201 Lyngbymotorvejen  Kgs. Lyngby  – Virum 
 Hillerødmotorvejen (Copenhagen - Allerød)
 Motorring 3 (Avedøre - Kgs Lyngby)
 Frederikssundmotorvejen   (Rødovre  - Tværvej) N
 Motorring 4 (Ballerup - Ishøj)
 Holbækmotorvejen (Copenhagen - Holbæk)
 Kalundborgmotorvejen (Elverdam - Dramstrup)
 Øresundsmotorvejen (exit 20 - Øresundsbroen)
 Amagermotorvejen (Avedøre - exit 20)
 Køge Bugt Motorvejen (Avedøre - Køge)
 Vestmotorvejen (Køge - Great Belt Fixed Link )
 Sydmotorvejen (Køge - Rødbyhavn)

Motorways under construction

 Fynske Motorvej (Gribsvad - Nørre Aaby) (extension 4 to 6 lanes) (2022)
 Fehmarn Belt Fixed Link Sydmotorvejen (Rødbyhavn - Puttgarten) (2029)

Motorways in planning
Danish motorways are developed by the Danish Road Directorate (a state-owned company) who maintain a list of motorway projects in development and planning (in Danish).

 Kalundborgmotorvejen (Dramstrup - Kalundborg) (2028)
 Hillerødmotorvejen (Allerød S – Hillerød N) (Expressway extension to the motorway) (EIA-assessment) (2028)
 Sønderjyske Motorvej (Kolding V - Motorvejskryds Kolding) (extension 4 to 6 lanes and 6 to 8 lanes) (EIA-assessment) (2028)
 Østjyske Motorvej (Vejle N - Skanderborg S) (extension 4 to 6 lanes) (EIA-assessment) (2028)
 Østjyske Motorvej (Aarhus - Aarhus N) (extension 4 to 6 lanes) (EIA-assessment) (2028)
 Amagermotorvejen - Helsingørmotorvejen (extension 6 to 8 lanes) (EIA-assessment) (2029)
 Amagermotorvejen (Motorvejskryds Avedøre - Øresundsmotorvejen) (extension 6 to 8 lanes) (EIA-assessment) (2029)
 Øresundsmotorvejen (exit 20 København C - exit 17 Lufthavn V) (extension 4 to 6 lanes) (east) and 6 to 8 lanes) (west) (feasibility study starts) (2029)
 Fynske Motorvej (Odense V - Odense SØ) (extension 4 to 6 lanes) (EIA-assessment) (2030)
 Næstvedmotorvejen (Næstved - Rønnede) (EIA-assessment) (2031)
 3. Limfjordsforbindelse (Aalborg S - Aalborg N) (EIA-assessment) (2032)
 Frederikssundmotorvejen (Tværvej N – Frederikssund N) (EIA-assessment) (2031)
 Midtjyske Motorvej (Herning N - Sinding) (Expressway extension to the motorway) (EIA-assessment) (2031)
 Hærvejsmotorvejen (Løvel - Klode Mølle) (feasibility study end) (2031)
 Hærvejsmotorvejen (Give - Billund) (EIA-assessment) (2031)
 Motorring 4 (Ishøj – Vallensbæk) (extension 6 to 8 lanes) (feasibility study starts) (2031)
 Hillerødmotorvejen (Motorring 3 – Ring 4) (extension 4 to 6 lanes) (feasibility study starts) (2033)
 Hillerødmotorvejen (Ring 4 – Farum) (extension 4 to 6 lanes) (feasibility study starts) (2034)
 (Helsingørmotorvejen) (Isterød - Hørsholm S (extension 4 to 6 lanes) (EIA-assessment)
 (Taulovmotorvejen) (Kolding V - Fredercia S) (extension 4 to 6 lanes) (EIA-assessment)
 Messemotorvejen (Herning V - Snejbjerg) (Expressway extension to the motorway) (EIA-assessment) 
 Østjyske Motorvej (Aarhus N - Randers N) (extension 4 to 6 lanes) (EIA-assessment)
 Hærvejsmotorvejen (Haderslev – Billund) (EIA-assessment end)
 Hærvejsmotorvejen (Hobro - Løvel and Klode Mølle - Give)  (feasibility study end)
 Roskildemotorvejen (Ringsted - Roskilde) (feasibility study starts)
 Holbækmotorvejen (Ring 4 - Roskilde) (extension 6 to 8 lanes) (feasibility study starts)
 Motorring 5 (Køge - Frederikssundmotorvejen) (feasibility study initiated)

See also
Transport in Denmark
List of controlled-access highway systems
Evolution of motorway construction in European nations

References

Highways in Denmark